Scortechinia is a genus of fungi in the Ascomycota, of the family Nitschkiaceae.

The genus was circumscribed by Pier Andrea Saccardo in Atti Reale Ist. Veneto Sci. Lett. Arti ser.6, vol.3 on page 713 in 1885.

The genus name of Scortechinia is in honour of Benedetto Scortechini (1845–1886), who was an Italian botanist, explorer, and Roman Catholic priest.

Species
As accepted by [[[Species Fungorum]];
 Scortechinia conferta 
 Scortechinia culcitella 
 Scortechinia diminutispora 

Former species;
 Scortechinia acanthostroma  = Nitschkia acanthostroma, Nitschkiaceae
 Scortechinia chaetomioides  = Nitschkia chaetomioides, Nitschkiaceae
 Scortechinia euomphala  = Tympanopsis confertula, Scortechiniaceae family
 Scortechinia massae  = Tympanopsis massae, Scortechiniaceae
 Scortechinia uniseriata  = Nitschkia uniseriata, Nitschkiaceae
 Scortechinia usambarensis  = Euacanthe usambarensis, Nitschkiaceae

References

Sordariomycetes genera
Coronophorales
Taxa named by Pier Andrea Saccardo